Cosmic entity can refer to:

Cosmology 
An entity that exists within the cosmos

Religion and spirituality 
An aspect of God in Judaism in the theology of Shneur Zalman of Liadi (d. 1812)
In mythology, any of the major components of the created cosmos (e.g. earth, heaven, sea, night, dawn, etc.)
The deification of such concepts, i.e. any cosmological deity

Occultism and Theosophy 
 A transcendent concept intended to replace or supplement the traditional concept of 'God':
In the writings of Gottfried de Purucker   (1935)
In the writings of the Theosophist Alice Bailey (1920s-1940s)
In the Ascended Master Teachings, a group of religions based on Theosophy, a cosmic entity is equivalent to a cosmic being

Popular culture 
 Cosmic entity (Marvel Comics)  
 Machine Elves as Described by Terence McKenna
 A term used in the Cthulhu Mythos by  H. P. Lovecraft